Castletown, historically called Ballycaslane, is a small village in northeast County Wexford, Ireland.

Castletown is in the parish of Kilgorman which is one of the earliest Christian settlements in Ireland. It was founded by St Gorman, possibly the same Gorman for whom Loch Garman (Wexford) is named and after whom St German's Cathedral on St Patrick's Isle off the Isle of Man is also named.

Location 
Castletown is located between the towns of Gorey and Arklow. It lies on the Wicklow/Wexford border and is situated at the foot of Tara Hill, County Wexford. Castletown has a small primary school and a church.

Tourism 
Castletown is within a tourist area, and there are several caravan parks and guesthouses in the area. Castletown is close to several beaches (Saleen, Clone, Kilpatrick and Kilmichael) and the pub called the "Golden Anchor".

History 
Castletown was the Wexford Headquarters of the Irish Republican Army. Its origins date back to the early days of the Irish War of Independence, when IRA fighting columns who had been training near by went for drinks in the Golden Anchor pub. Each year a commemorative rally is held in village to honour those who drank in the Golden Anchor. The Flag bearers lead proceedings from Golden Anchor to Castletown Cemetery. Afterwards they head back to the Anchor for refreshments. The meeting was first held in 1970 and only failed to commence on two occasions in 1984 and 2010 when snow halted processions.

Sports

GAA 
Castletown GAA club is between Castletown and the village of Tarahill. Castletown was a football only club up until the 1960s when the decision was made to form a hurling club as Wexford had just won an All Ireland title. Records show that football was played around the area since 1887 when a team from Castletown went to play a football match in a field near the Kish. The club was then known as "Castletown" GAA club but is now known as "Castletown Liam Mellows" GAA club as the hurling club was established. The new club was called Liam Mellows in honour of the executed Irish Republican, Liam Mellows. The club played their first game in Gorey against Craanford. The club first won the district title in 1963 but were beaten in the County Semi-Final by St. Martins.  In 1964, after again winning the Gorey District, Liam Mellows went on to overcome Na Fianna from Wexford town to win the Junior Championship.

Camogie and LGFA 
Castletown also has both Ladies football and camogie clubs. Both clubs play in the "junior A" division.

See also
 List of towns and villages in Ireland

References

Towns and villages in County Wexford